James A. Torrey (September 27, 1868 – August 14, 1954) was a Canadian-born American politician who served as Mayor of Beverly, Massachusetts and as a member of the Massachusetts General Court.

Early life
Torrey was born on September 27, 1868 in Nova Scotia. He moved to the United States as a young man and settled in Beverly, Massachusetts around 1891.

Political career
Torrey was a member of the Beverly City Council for seven years and the Board of Alderman for three. From 1919 to 1928 he was a member of the Massachusetts House of Representatives. From 1929 to 1930 he represented the 2nd Essex District in the Massachusetts Senate.

In 1930, Torrey was elected Mayor of Beverly. He defeated Matthew S. Heaphy with a plurality of 261 votes in one of the closest elections in the city's history. In 1932, Torrey was defeated in his reelection bid by former Alderman Paul S. Eaton by 649 votes. Two years later, Torrey won a three-way race for mayor, defeating Eaton and Daniel E. McLean with 4185 votes to McLane's 2863 and Eaton's 2419. McLane defeated Torrey in the next election 5493 votes to 4493.

Later life and death
A blacksmith by trade, Torrey also worked in auto repair, was treasurer of Cabot Welding Co. and the Lite-Rite Manufacturing Co., and a vice president and trustee of the Beverly Savings Bank. After leaving politics, Torrey continued to operate blacksmith a shop until his death on August 14, 1954 at the age of 85.

See also
 1919 Massachusetts legislature
 1920 Massachusetts legislature
 1921–1922 Massachusetts legislature
 1923–1924 Massachusetts legislature
 1925–1926 Massachusetts legislature
 1927–1928 Massachusetts legislature
 1929–1930 Massachusetts legislature

References

1868 births
1954 deaths
Canadian emigrants to the United States
Mayors of Beverly, Massachusetts
Republican Party members of the Massachusetts House of Representatives